Lachlan Cameron (12 April 1909 – 2 August 1992) was an  Australian rules footballer who played with Hawthorn in the Victorian Football League (VFL).

Notes

External links 

1909 births
1992 deaths
Australian rules footballers from Victoria (Australia)
Hawthorn Football Club players
Bairnsdale Football Club players